Patmos is a Greek island.

Patmos may also refer to:
 Patmos, Arkansas, a town in the United States
 Patmos, Georgia, an unincorporated community in the United States
 Patmos, Mississippi, an unincorporated community in the United States
 Patmos, Ohio, an unincorporated community in the United States
 Patmos Peak, a mountain in Antarctica

See also
 John of Patmos
 Patnos, a town in Turkey and former Armenian city